

Champions

Major League Baseball
World Series: Milwaukee Braves over New York Yankees (4–3); Lew Burdette, MVP
All-Star Game, July 9 at Busch Stadium: American League, 6–5

Other champions
College World Series: California
Japan Series: Nishitetsu Lions over Yomiuri Giants (4-0-1)
Little League World Series: Monterrey Industrial, Monterrey, Mexico
Winter Leagues
1957 Caribbean Series: Tigres de Marianao
Cuban League: Tigres de Marianao
Dominican Republic League: Leones del Escogido
Mexican Pacific League: Naranjeros de Hermosillo
Panamanian League: Cerveza Balboa
Puerto Rican League: Indios de Mayagüez
Venezuelan League: Leones del Caracas

Awards and honors
Baseball Hall of Fame
Sam Crawford
Joe McCarthy
MLB Most Valuable Player Award
 American League: Mickey Mantle, New York Yankees, OF
 National League: Hank Aaron, Milwaukee Braves, OF
MLB Rookie of the Year Award
 American League: Tony Kubek, New York Yankees, SS
 National League: Jack Sanford, Philadelphia Phillies, P
Cy Young Award
Warren Spahn, Milwaukee Braves (NL)
The Sporting News Player of the Year Award
Ted Williams, Boston Red Sox
The Sporting News Pitcher of the Year Award
American League: Billy Pierce, Chicago White Sox
National League: Warren Spahn, Milwaukee Braves
The Sporting News Manager of the Year Award
Fred Hutchinson, St. Louis Cardinals
Gold Glove Award
Gil Hodges (1B) (AL) 
Nellie Fox (2B) (AL) 
Frank Malzone (3B) (AL) 
Roy McMillan (SS) (AL) 
Willie Mays (OF) (AL) 
Al Kaline (OF) (AL) 
Minnie Miñoso (OF) (AL)
Sherm Lollar (C) (AL) 
Bobby Shantz (P) (AL)

MLB statistical leaders

Major league baseball final standings

American League final standings

National League final standings

Events

January

February

March

April
April 18 – New York City Parks Commissioner Robert Aaron proposes a new  tract in Flushing Meadows as a site for a new National League baseball stadium. The plan, submitted to mayor Robert Wagner, includes a 50,000-seat stadium with a plastic dome to be built by the Parks Department.
April 21 – In the first inning of a 3-1 loss to the Milwaukee Braves at Milwaukee County Stadium, the Cincinnati Redlegs are involved in a bizarre play. With Don Hoak on second and Gus Bell on first, Wally Post hits a ground ball to Milwaukee shortstop Johnny Logan. Hoak breaks up a potential double play by fielding the ball himself and flipping it to Logan. Hoak is called out for interference (contact with a batted ball before a fielder touched it), but Post is given a single on the play. The day before, Johnny Temple let Bell's ground ball hit him with the same result, Temple being called out for interference and Bell being awarded a single. The two incidents prompt league presidents Warren Giles and Will Harridge to jointly announce a rule change that declared both the runner and batter out if the runner intentionally interfered with a batted ball, with no runners allowed to advance.
April 22 – John Irvin Kennedy becomes the first black player in Philadelphia Phillies history, entering the game in the top of the 8th inning as a pinch runner for Solly Hemus.
April 24
The New York City Board Of Estimates fails to act on the Moses plan as outlined by Mayor Wagner.
In the 4th inning of a Chicago Cubs 9–5 loss to the Cincinnati Redlegs at Crosley Field, Cubs pitcher Moe Drabowsky claims to be hit on the foot by a Joe Nuxhall pitch. Afterwards, teammate Dick Drott borrows a wheelchair from a crippled fan and wheels Drabowsky to first base, and immediately is ejected by home plate umpire Stan Landes. Drabowsky is eventually called out on strikes.

May
May 7 – Two batters into the game at Cleveland Stadium, Cleveland Indian pitcher Herb Score is hit in the face by a line drive by New York Yankee Gil McDougald, the ball breaking numerous bones in Score's face and leaving him quite bloodied. McDougald vows to quit if Score is blinded as a result. Score regains his 20/20 vision, but will miss the remainder of the 1957 season. With Bob Lemon pitching the rest of the way, the Indians defeat the Yankees 2-1.
May 10 – Mayor George Christopher of San Francisco confers with Horace Stoneham on a possible shift of the New York Giants franchise to the West Coast.
May 28 – The National League approves the proposed moves of the Giants and Brooklyn Dodgers to the West Coast, provided both clubs make their request before October 1 and move at the same time.
May 29 – New York City mayor Robert Wagner  says he plans to confer with the Giants and Dodgers about the proposed move, but that the city will not be "blackjacked" into anything.
May 30 – Walter O'Malley rejects an offer from a Queens group to buy the Dodgers.

June
June 9 – Ernie Banks hit his 100th career home run, helping the Chicago Cubs beat the Philadelphia Phillies, 7-3.

July
July 9 – At Sportsman's Park, home of the St. Louis Cardinals, the American League defeats the National League, 6-5, in the All-Star Game. Seven Cincinnati Redlegs - Ed Bailey, Gus Bell, Don Hoak, Roy McMillan, Wally Post, Frank Robinson and Johnny Temple - had been "voted" in as starters for the National League, with first baseman George Crowe the only Redleg not voted in, being beaten out in the final vote tally by hometown favorite Stan Musial. After an investigation found this was the result of a ballot stuffing campaign by Redlegs fans, Commissioner Ford Frick removed Bell and Post from the starting lineup and replaced them with Hank Aaron and Willie Mays; Bell remained on the team as a reserve, while Post was injured and would have been unable to play in any event.
July 18 – New York Giants owner Horace Stoneham says the team will quit New York City after the season. He says he has not heard anything more from San Francisco and that his move is not contingent on that of the Dodgers. He sees a new stadium or joint occupancy with the New York Yankees as the only reason for the Giants to stay in New York.
july 20 - In a key pennant chase game, the Brooklyn Dodgers beat the Chicago Cubs 7-5. Duke Snider was the star of the game as he hit his 24th homer of the season, his 8th in 10 games since the All-Star Game and most important he hit his 300th home run in this game.
July 26 – Mickey Mantle hits 200th career home run.

August
August 1 – Gil Hodges belted his 13th career grand slam to establish a new record in the National League. This would also be the last grand slam in the history of the Brooklyn Dodgers club.
August 19 – As Stoneham cites poor attendance as the reason for the Giants' move, the team's board of directors votes 8-1 to move to California in 1958, as San Francisco promises a new stadium in the Bayview area. The only dissenting vote is by M. Donald Grant, who would go on to be one of the founders of the New York Mets.
August 20 – Bob Keegan of the Chicago White Sox no-hits the Washington Senators 6-0 in the second game of a doubleheader at Comiskey Park.

September
September 2 – In the first game of a doubleheader at Wrigley Field, Frank Torre of the Milwaukee Braves ties a National League record by scoring six runs in the Braves' 23-10 victory over the Chicago Cubs.
September 8 - The Brooklyn Dodgers and New York Giants battle one last time before each one heads off to California. The Giants defeated the Dodgers 3-2 in the Polo Grounds.
September 14 – Ernie Banks hits 3 home runs helping Chicago Cubs beat Pittsburgh Pirates 7-3.
September 23 – The Milwaukee Braves clinch the National League pennant at Milwaukee County Stadium after Braves slugger (and eventual 1957 National League MVP) Hank Aaron clubs a two-run walk-off home run off of Billy Muffett in the bottom of the 11th inning to give Milwaukee a 4-2 victory over the St. Louis Cardinals.
September 24 – In the last game at Brooklyn's Ebbets Field in a night game, 6,702 fans watch Dodgers lefty Danny McDevitt prevail over the Pittsburgh Pirates 2-0. Brooklyn's Gil Hodges has the last RBI.
September 29 – With 1895 Giants manager Jack Doyle among the 11,606 looking on, the Giants lose their last game at the Polo Grounds 9-1 to the Pittsburgh Pirates. Pirates pitcher Bob Friend defeats Johnny Antonelli in the historic contest, and fans storm the field for souvenirs as soon as Dusty Rhodes grounds to Pittsburgh shortstop Dick Groat for the final out.

October
October 7 – The Los Angeles City Council approves the Chavez Ravine site for Dodger Stadium by a vote of 10 to 4. It would not be until 1962 that a New York team will again represent the National League.
October 8 – Brooklyn Dodgers owner Walter O'Malley announces that the Dodgers will be moving to Los Angeles for the 1958 season.
October 10 – The Milwaukee Braves defeat the New York Yankees, 5-0, in Game 7 the World Series to win the franchise's second World Series, and only title in the city of Milwaukee, four games to three. Milwaukee became the first team to win a title after relocating. Braves pitcher Lew Burdette was named World Series Most Valuable Player with three complete games, including two shutouts. He was the first pitcher to pitch two shutouts in the World Series since Christy Mathewson in the 1905 World Series.

November
November 12 – Frank Lane resigns as general manager of the St. Louis Cardinals and is replaced by Bing Devine.
November 20 – Shigeo Nagashima, a slugger star at Rikkyo University, signs with the Yomiuri Giants for a record bonus of $69,000.
November 22:
Mickey Mantle barely edges Ted Williams, 233 to 209 votes, to win the American League MVP Award. Mantle batted .365 with 34 home runs for the first-place New York Yankees, while Williams, of the third-place Boston Red Sox, led the AL with a .388 average and 38 home runs, as well as a stunning .731 slugging percentage. Red Sox owner Tom Yawkey fumes at the news, noting that two Chicago writers listed Williams in the ninth and tenth places on their ballots.
After 22 seasons of work, Larry Goetz is unwillingly 'retired' as a National League umpire by league's president Warren Giles. The discharged arbitrator had been critical of the Senior Circuit because of the league's refusal to include umpires in the players' pension fund.
November 26 – Yoshio Tanaka, an American citizen of Japanese descent, is named manager of the Hanshin Tigers, becoming the first American to manage a NPB club.
November 28 – Milwaukee Braves pitcher Warren Spahn, who posted a 21-11  record with 111 strikeouts and a 3.49 ERA, wins the MLB Cy Young Award almost unanimously. His only competition for the title is Dick Donovan of the Chicago White Sox (16-6, 88, 3.35), who receives one vote. Only one pitcher is selected each season for this prestigious pitching award until , when each league will name a winner.
November 29 – New York City Mayor Robert F. Wagner, Jr. forms a four-member committee to find replacement teams for the Dodgers and Giants in NYC.

December
December 2 – Three Pacific Coast League franchises are forced to relocate when the Brooklyn Dodgers confirmed their long-rumored move to Los Angeles for the 1958 season and the New York Giants announced their move to San Francisco. As a result, the Hollywood Stars move from Los Angeles to Salt Lake City, the Los Angeles Angels transfer to Spokane, Washington, and the San Francisco Seals move to Phoenix, Arizona.
December 7 - The Associated Press votes Tony Kubek as the American League rookie of the year. Frank Malzone the only other candidate received one vote.

Movies
Fear Strikes Out

Births

January
January   5 – Bob Dernier
January 13 – Mike Madden
January 14 – Tony Brizzolara
January 16 – Steve Balboni
January 16 – Marty Castillo
January 19 – Brad Mills
January 22 – Brian Dayett
January 23 – Alfonso Pulido
January 25 – John Flannery

February
February   1 – Tom Wieghaus
February   2 – Craig Chamberlain
February   3 – Larry Poncino
February   3 – Don Welchel
February   4 – Randy Gomez
February   7 – Dámaso García
February   7 – Carney Lansford
February   9 – Pat Underwood
February 10 – Jeff Cornell
February 12 – Steve Brown
February 14 – Jaime Cocanower
February 19 – Dave Stewart
February 20 – Jesús Figueroa
February 23 – Jim Anderson

March
March   1 – Johnny Ray
March   3 – Skeeter Barnes
March   5 – Jerry Ujdur
March   8 – John Butcher
March   8 – Bob Stoddard
March 12 – Mike Quade
March 13 – Duane Walker
March 14 – Steve Lake
March 14 – Ty Waller
March 15 – Freddie Martinez
March 18 – Rickey Keeton
March 18 – Al Olmsted
March 21 – Luis Leal
March 27 – Dave Van Gorder

April
April   1 – Manny Castillo
April   7 – Rick Engle
April 17 – Dave Huppert
April 21 – Jesse Orosco
April 22 – Dave Schmidt
April 23 – Darryl Cias
April 27 – Willie Upshaw

May
May   1 – Allan Ramirez
May   4 – Rick Leach
May   6 – Kim Seaman
May   9 – Steve Hammond
May   9 – John Stuper
May 12 – Lou Whitaker
May 14 – Fran Mullins
May 16 – Mark Funderburk
May 17 – Pascual Pérez
May 19 – Ben Callahan
May 28 – Kirk Gibson
May 28 – Tom Grant

June
June   4 – Tony Peña
June   6 – Steve Fireovid
June   6 – Max Venable
June   7 – Marty Decker
June   8 – Don Robinson
June 14 – Greg Brock
June 14 – Tony Castillo
June 15 – Brett Butler
June 16 – Salomé Barojas
June 19 – Bob Gibson
June 21 – Jay Pettibone
June 24 – Doug Jones
June 26 – Jose Barrios
June 26 – Mike Griffin
June 29 – Eddie Miller
June 30 – Bud Black

July
July 3 – Danny Heep
July 6 – Rich Murray
July 7 – Dan Gladden
July 12 – Manabu Kitabeppu
July 13 – Chris Jones
July 18 – Chris Smith
July 19 – Curt Kaufman
July 22 – Dave Stieb
July 27 – Floyd Rayford
July 30 – Clint Hurdle
July 30 – Steve Trout
July 31 – Howard Bailey
July 31 – Leon Durham

August
August   1 – Myron White
August   4 – Ben Hayes
August   6 – Bob Horner
August   8 – Ray Fontenot
August   9 – John Moses
August 17 – Bill Landrum
August 19 – Scott Meyer
August 19 – David Palmer
August 20 – DeWayne Buice
August 21 – Steve Eddy
August 21 – Frank Pastore
August 23 – Mike Boddicker
August 23 – Tim Welke
August 24 – Butch Benton
August 26 – Alex Treviño
August 30 – Dave Smith
August 31 – Tom Candiotti

September
September   1 – Dave Rucker
September   4 – Kelly Heath
September 10 – Len Whitehouse
September 12 – Mario Ramírez
September 14 – Jerry Don Gleaton
September 14 – Tim Wallach
September 18 – Roger Mason
September 23 – Tony Fossas
September 25 – Glenn Hubbard
September 26 – Kelvin Moore
September 26 – Doug Sisk
September 29 – Tim Flannery
September 29 – Craig Lefferts
September 30 – Ed Rapuano

October
October   2 – Andre Robertson
October   5 – Onix Concepción
October   6 – Alfredo Griffin
October   8 – Mike Chris
October   8 – Bob Skube
October 17 – Kelly Paris
October 18 – Mike Walters
October 20 – Rick Ownbey
October 22 – Jeff Jones
October 23 – Dwight Lowry
October 24 – Ron Gardenhire
October 24 – Bill Hayes
October 24 – Ed Jurak
October 26 – Harry Chappas
October 29 – Terry Felton
October 29 – George Stablein
October 30 – Houston Jiménez

November
November   1 – José Moreno
November   9 – Teddy Higuera
November 10 – Jeff Twitty
November 11 – Wil Culmer
November 25 – Tony Brewer
November 28 – Pat Rooney
November 29 – Dennis Burtt

December
December   4 – Mike Couchee
December   4 – Pat Sheridan
December   4 – Lee Smith
December   6 – Steve Bedrosian
December   9 – Steve Christmas
December   9 – Ed Romero
December 16 – Tom Gorman
December 17 – Mark Dempsey
December 17 – Bob Ojeda
December 20 – Bill Laskey
December 21 – Tom Henke
December 24 – Víctor Cruz

Deaths

January
January   6 – Ed Abbaticchio, 79, middle infielder who played with four teams in three different leagues over nine seasons between 1897 and 1910, most prominently for the 1909 World Champion Pittsburgh Pirates.
January   6 – Gil Gallagher, 60, shortstop for the 1922 Boston Braves.
January   7 – Ches Crist, 74, backup catcher who played in 1906 for the Philadelphia Phillies.
January   9 – Billy Gleason, 62, second baseman who played with the Pittsburgh Pirates from 1916 to 1917 and for the St. Louis Browns in 1921.
January 12 – Victor Starffin, 40, Hall of Fame Japanese Baseball League pitcher 
January 17 – Carl Sawyer, 66, middle infielder and third baseman who played from 1915 to 1916 for the Washington Senators.
January 17 – Tom Stanton, 82, catcher for the 1904 Chicago Cubs.
January 19 – Larry Strands, 71, outfielder who played for the Newark Pepper of the outlaw Federal League in 1915, and later spent six seasons in the Minor Leagues from 1911 through 1916.
January 22 – Petie Behan, 69, pitcher who spent time with the Guelph Maple Leafs of the Ontario-based Intercounty Baseball League in the early 1910s, before joining the Philadelphia Phillies from 1921 to 1923.  
January 31 – Chick Maynard, 60, shortstop for the 1922 Boston Red Sox.

February
February   8 – Lee McElwee, 62, third baseman for the 1916 Philadelphia Athletics.
February 16 – Cap Clark, 60, backup catcher for the Philadelphia Phillies in the 1938 season. 
February 19 – Red Munson, 73, catcher who played for the Philadelphia Phillies in 1905.
February 20 – Dixie Leverett, 62, pitcher whose major league career spanned five season from 1922–1929 for the Chicago White Sox and Boston Braves.
February 22 – Jim Begley, 54, second baseman who made two game appearances for the Cincinnati Reds in the 1924 season.
February 24 – Bugs Reisigl, 69, pitcher for the 1911 Cleveland Naps.

March
March   2 – Frank Hafner, 89, 19th century pitched who played two games for the 1888 Kansas City Cowboys of the American Association.
March 10 – Erskine Mayer, 68, left handed pitcher for the Philadelphia Phillies and Chicago White Sox Pittsburgh Pirates through eight seasons from 1912–19, ending with a 91-70 record and 2.96 ERA in 245 games while collecting back-to-back 21-wins seasons for Philadelphia in 1914 and 1915.
March 12 – Dick Niehaus, 64, pitcher who played from 1913 through 1915 with the St. Louis Cardinals and for the Cleveland Indians in 1920.
March 20 – Ezra Midkiff, third baseman who played tith the Cincinnati Reds in 1909 and for the New York Highlanders/Yankees from 1912–13.
March 22 – Charlie Babington, 61, backup outfielder for the New York Giants in the 1915 season.
March 31 – Billy Meyer, 64, catcher and manager who played with the Chicago White Sox in 1913 and for the Philadelphia Athletics from 1916–1917, before managing the Pittsburgh Pirates over five seasons from 1948–1952; his uniform #1 was retired by the Pirates in 1954.

April
April   5 – Art Bader, 70, backup outfielder for the 1904 St. Louis Browns.
April   7 – Jim Scott, 68, two-time 20-win pitcher for the Chicago White Sox when the team won its only two championships of the 20th century in 1906 and 1917, winning 107 with a 2.30 earned run average in nine seasons from 1909–1917, who later spent 25 years working in major and minor league baseball as a pitcher and umpire, while remains as one of the leading pitchers in franchise history, as his career ERA ranks 19th all-time in MLB history.
April 15 – Jack Coombs, 74, a key member of the Philadelphia Athletics pitching staff along with Chief Bender and Eddie Plank in the 1910–1911 World Champion teams, when he posted a 31-6 record with 13 shutouts and 1.30 ERA in 1910, then defeating three times the Chicago Cubs in the 1910 World Series, going 28-12 the next season and 2-0 against the New York Giants in the 1911 World Series, while previously pitching and winning a 24-inning, 4-1 complete game victory over the Boston Red Sox in 1904, as his 13 shutouts and 24-inning complete game still single season records in American League.
April 15 – Ernie Padgett, 58, third baseman and  middle infielder for the Boston Braves and Cleveland Indians in parts of five seasons spanning 1923–1927, who is best known for turning the fourth unassisted triple play in Major League Baseball history on October 6, 1923.
April 15 – Rube Schauer, 66, Russian pitcher who played for the New York Giants and Philadelphia Athletics over five seasons from 1913 through 1917.
April 18 – Wally Reinecker, 66,  third baseman who played for the Baltimore Terrapins of the outlaw Federal League in 1915.
April 18 – Bill Sweeney, 52, first baseman who played with the Detroit Tigers in 1928 and Boston Red Sox from 1930–1931, and coach for the Tigers in 1946–1947; managed for 19 seasons in the Pacific Coast League, winning pennants with the Portland Beavers in 1936 and the Los Angeles Angels in 1943 and 1944; incumbent manager of the Beavers at the time of his death.
April 22 – Joe Benz, 71, spitball and knuckleball especialist who pitched from 1911 through 1919 for the Chicago White Sox, being a member of two American League champion teams in both 1917 and 1919, while pitching a no-hitter against the Cleveland Naps in 1914.

May
May   6 – Ralph Judd, 55, pitcher who played with the Washington Senators in 1927 and for the New York Giants from 1929 to 1930.
May 12 – Fred Bennett, 55, right fielder who played with the St. Louis Browns in 1928 and for the Pittsburgh Pirates in 1931.
May 17 – Dummy Deegan, 82, deaf-mute pitcher who posted a 0-1 record and 6.35 ERA in two appearances for the 1901 New York Giants.
May 20 – Roy Hutson, 55, fourth outfielder for the Brooklyn Robins in its 1925 season.

June
June   1 – Pete Schneider, 61, hard-throwing pitcher who played for the Cincinnati Reds from 1914 to 1918 and the New York Yankees in 1919, whose best season was in 1917, when he won 20 games and finished sixth in the National League with a 2.10 ERA.
June   4 – Paul Krichell, 74, French catcher for the St. Louis Browns in parts of two season from 1911–1912, who later became head scout for the New York Yankees for 37 years, signing over 200 players, including future Baseball Hall of Famers Lou Gehrig, Phil Rizzuto, Whitey Ford and Tony Lazzeri.
June   5 – Pete Wilson, 71, pitcher for the New York Highlanders from 1908 to 1909.
June 10 – George Rohe, 82, reserve infielder for the Baltimore Orioles and Chicago White Sox over parts of four seasons spanning 1901–1907, who unexpectedly became a postseason hero after going 7-for-27 with two triples, a double and four RBI, helping the Hitless Wonders White Sox defeat the highly favored Chicago Cubs in six games of the 1906 World Series for one of the greatest upsets in Series history.
June 10 – John Slappey, 58, pitcher for the 1920 Philadelphia Athletics.
June 11 – Fred Raymer, 81, middle infielder and third baseman who played with the Chicago Orphans in 1901 and for the Boston Beaneaters from 1904 to 1905.
June 15 – Rip Wade, 59, fourth outfielder for the 1923 Washington Senators.
June 18 – Milo Allison, 66, backup outfielder who played for the Chicago Cubs and Cleveland Indians in a span of four seasons from 1913–1917.
June 20 – Cy Warmoth, 64, pitcher who played with the St. Louis Cardinals in 1916 and for the Washington Senators from 1922–1923.
June 24 – Jack Burns, 77, second baseman who played for the Detroit Tigers in 1903 and 1904.
June 26 – Tom Whelan, 63, first baseman for the 1920 Boston Braves.
June 29 – Deacon Van Buren, 86, left fielder who played for the Brooklyn Superbas and Philadelphia Phillies during the 1904 season.

July
July   3 – Dolf Luque, 66, Cuban pitcher whose Major League Baseball career included stints for the Boston Braves, Cincinnati Reds, Brooklyn Robins and New York Giants over twenty seasons from 1914 through 1935, posting a 194-179 record and 3.24 ERA in 550 pitching appearances, leading the National League with 27 wins in 1923 and twice in ERA in 1923 (1.93) and 1925 (2.63), while winning World Series rings with the Reds in 1919 and the Giants in 1933, and later becoming a successful manager in the Cuban Winter League, where he won eight pennant titles.
July 15 – Rip Wade, backup outfielder for the 1923 Washington Senators.
July 25 – Frank Welch, 59, outfielder who played from 1919 through 1927 for the Philadelphia Athletics and Boston Red Sox.
July 29 – Tommy Thevenow, 53, an elite defensive shortstop who played for five teams in a span of fifteen seasons from 1924–1938, compiling a solid .952 fielding average while hitting a subpar .247 average with just two inside-the-park home runs in 4,164 at-bats, being most remembered as an unsung hero for hitting .417 (10-for-24) for the St. Louis Cardinals in the 1926 World Series, including an inside-the-park homer in Game 2 and the two winning RBI in the decisive Game 7 against the New York Yankees.

August
August 14 – Tim Hendryx, 66, outfielder who played for the Cleveland Naps, New York Yankees, St. Louis Browns and Boston Red Sox over eight seasons spanning 1911–1921, whose most productive season came with the Red Sox in 1920 as a replacement for departed Babe Ruth at right field, when he posted a .328/.400/.413 batting line with 54 runs scored, 119 hits and 73 RBI, all career-highs, while appearing in 99 games.
August 15 – Ed Baecht, 50, pitcher for the Philadelphia Phillies, Chicago Cubs and St. Louis Browns over all or parts of six seasons from 1926–1937.
August 21 – Harry Damrau, 66, third baseman for the 1915 Philadelphia Athletics.
August 25 – Ivy Griffin, 60, first baseman who played from 1919 through 1921 for the Philadelphia Athletics.

September
September   2 – Don Hanski, 41, first baseman and left-handed pitcher who played for the Chicago White Sox from 1943 to 1944.
September   9 – Ed Karger, 74, pitcher for the Pittsburgh Pirates, St. Louis Cardinals, Cincinnati Reds and Boston Red Sox over six seasons spanning 1906–1911, who was given credit for a seven inning perfect game against the Boston Doves while pitching for St. Louis in 1907.
September   9 – Bill Miller, 78, German outfielder who played for the Pittsburgh Pirates in its 1902 season.
September 12 – Homer Thompson, 66, backup catcher for the 1912 New York Highlanders.
September 15 – Max Butcher, 46, pitcher who played from 1936 through 1945 for the Brooklyn Dodgers, Philadelphia Phillies and Pittsburgh Pirates.
September 25 – Marty Becker, 63, center fielder for the 1915 New York Giants.

October
October   6 – Billy Campbell, 83, pitcher for the St. Louis Cardinals and Cincinnati Reds over parts of four seasons spanning 1905–1909.  
October   6 – Phil Cooney, 75, third baseman who made one game appearance for the 1905 New York Highlanders.
October   8 – Paul Russell, utility man who played with the St. Louis Browns in its 1894 season.
October   9 – Butch Henline, 62, catcher for the New York Giants, Philadelphia Phillies, Brooklyn Robins and Chicago White Sox over eleven seasons from 1921–1931, being active as a player until 1934 in the American Association and International League, then began his umpiring career in the Southeastern League in 1939 and moved to the IL from 1940 to 1944, serving later as a National League umpire from 1945 to 1948, while working in the 1947 All-Star Game.
October 15 – Neal Ball, 76, shortstop for the New York Highlanders, Cleveland Naps and Boston Red Sox from 1907 through 1912, who was a member of the 1912 World Series Red Sox champion team and was the first player to turn an unassisted triple play in Major League Baseball history on July 19, 1909.
October 22 – Larry Pezold, 64,  third baseman for the 1914 Cleveland Naps.
October 26 – Erwin Renfer, 65, pitcher who made a one-game appearance for the 1913 Detroit Tigers.
October 30 – Fred Beebe, 77, pitcher whose career included stints for the Chicago Cubs, St. Louis Cardinals, Cincinnati Reds, Philadelphia Phillies and Cleveland Indians over seven seasons between 1906 and 1916, who as a rookie in 1906, posted 15 wins with a 2.93 ERA and led the National League with 171 strikeouts.

November
November   1 – Charlie Caldwell, 56, pitcher for the 1925 New York Yankees, who later coached three sports at Williams College between 1925 and 1946, receiving AFCA Coach of the Year Award honors in 1950 and an induction to the College Football Hall of Fame in 1961.
November   5 – Deke White, 85, 19th century pitcher who played for the Philadelphia Phillies in its 1895 season.
November   8 – Fred Anderson, 71, pitcher for the Boston Red Sox, Buffalo Blues and New York Giants over seven seasons spanning 1909–1918, posting a 53-57 record and 2.86 earned run average in 178 games, while leading the National League with a 1.44 ERA in 1917.
November   8 – Joe Connor, 82, backup catcher for the  St. Louis Browns, Boston Beaneaters, Milwaukee Brewers, Cleveland Blues and New York Highlanders in parts of four seasons between 1895 and 1905.
November 19 – Frank Foreman, 94, well-traveled pitcher who was one of 19 men who played in four Major Leagues – the original Union Association, the American Association, the National League, and the American League in its inaugural season, pitching for 11 different clubs over eleven seasons from 1884–1902 while posting a 96-93 record and 3.97 ERA in 229 games, and whose Minor League career took him through seven leagues, primarily in the Northeast and Midwest circuits.
November 21 – Bugs Bennett, 65, pitcher who played for the St. Louis Browns and Chicago White Sox during three seasons between 1918 and 1921.
November 27 – Chuck Wolfe, 60, pitcher for the 1923 Philadelphia Athletics.
November 28 – Ed Donnelly, 78, pitcher who played from 1911 to 1912 for the Boston Rustlers and Braves teams.

December
December   3 – Jack Ness, 72, first baseman who had short stints with the Detroit Tigers in 1911 and the Chicago White Sox in 1916, whose career highlight came as a member of the Triple-A Oakland Oaks in 1915, while establishing a new standard for Organized Baseball when he hit safely in 49 consecutive Pacific Coast League games.
December   4 – Jimmy Jordan, 49, middle infielder who played for the Brooklyn Dodgers over four seasons from 1933 to 1936.
December   5 – Alex Ferson, 91, 19th century pitcher who played for the Washington Nationals, Buffalo Bisons and Baltimore Orioles in parts of three seasons spanning 1889–1892.
December 10 – Hal Kleine, 34, pitcher who played from 1944 to 1945 for the Cleveland Indians.
December 12 – George Daly, 70, pitcher who played for the New York Giants in its 1909 season.
December 17 – Fritz Ostermueller, 50, pitcher whose 14-season career included stints with the Boston Red Sox, St. Louis Browns, Brooklyn Dodgers and Pittsburgh Pirates from 1934–1948, being portrayed in the 2013 film 42 as a pitcher who feared Jackie Robinson at the plate. 
December 21 – Marty Berghammer, 69, shortstop who played with the Chicago White Sox, Cincinnati Reds and Pittsburgh Rebels in a span of four seasons from 1911–1915.
December 24 – Hal Reilly, 63, left fielder for the 1919 Chicago Cubs.
December 26 – Tom Fleming, 84, center fielder who played for the New York Giants and Philadelphia Phillies in three seasons between 1899 and 1904.

Sources

External links

Baseball Almanac - Major League Baseball Players Who Were Born in 1957
Baseball Almanac - Major League Baseball Players Who Died in 1957
Baseball Reference - 1957 MLB Season Summary  
ESPN - 1957 MLB Season History